Cychropsis meihuanae is a species of ground beetle in the subfamily of Carabinae. It was described by Imura in 1998.

References

meihuanae
Beetles described in 1998